Our Lady of the Lakes Catholic School is a private, Roman Catholic school in Waterford Township, Michigan, United States.  It is one of only 5 PK-12 schools in the Roman Catholic Archdiocese of Detroit.

The high school was established in 1960  and shares its Waterford campus with Our Lady of the Lakes Elementary School and Middle School. Also sharing the campus is Our Lady of the Lakes parish church. Our Lady of the Lakes parish school was established in 1956 as an elementary school.

Our Lady of the Lakes is accredited by the Michigan Association of Non-Public Schools

Campus
Groundbreaking occurred on October 28, 1956 with the school opening in 1958. Its first class graduated in June 1962. In 1992 a new addition with a common area, another gymnasium, and four classrooms opened.

Athletics
The Lakers are members of the Michigan High School Athletic Association (MHSAA) and compete in the Detroit Catholic High School League (CHSL) as well as the Catholic Youth Organization (CYO) for grades 5-8.

Sports offered at Our Lady of the Lakes High School include:

Baseball
State champion – 1991
Basketball 
Girls state champion - 2010, 2011, 2012
Bowling 
Cross Country
Football 
State champion - 2002
Golf
Boys state champion - 1986, 1989, 1990, 1997
Hockey
Soccer
Girls state champion - 2010
Softball 
State champion - 1983, 1987, 1992, 1993, 1999, 2000, 2003, 2004
Tennis
Track
Volleyball

The Lakers' eight softball state championships are the most by any MHSAA school in that sport (as of 2015).

Notable alumni
Ryan Riess ('08), 2013 World Series of Poker Main Event Champion
Earl Boyea, fifth bishop of the Roman Catholic Diocese of Lansing

Notes and references

External links
 School Website 

Roman Catholic Archdiocese of Detroit
Catholic secondary schools in Michigan
Schools in Oakland County, Michigan
High schools in Oakland County, Michigan
Educational institutions established in 1956
1956 establishments in Michigan
Private K-12 schools in Michigan